The Croche River is a tributary of Saint-Maurice River, and flows in the regions of Haute-Mauricie and Saguenay-Lac-Saint-Jean, in the province of Quebec, Canada. The Croche River crosses the following cantons of Chabanel and Bécard, in Lac-Ashuapmushuan (unorganized territory), in the MRC Le Domaine-du-Roy Regional County Municipality, in the administrative region of Saguenay–Lac-Saint-Jean and the cantons of Michaux, Lavoie, Langelier and Malhiot, in the territory of La Tuque, in Mauricie.

Croche River is one of the five largest tributaries of the Saint-Maurice River.

Geography 
The Croche River rises at the mouth of Caribou Lake (length:  in the North-South axis;).

Many small rivers feed the northern half of the river's course. For many segments of its path, the river flows through many rapids, waterfalls and cascades.

Upper course 
(segment of )

  northwards, to the south shore of Caribou lake;
  to the east, crossing Caribou lake, to the dam located at the mouth;
  to the East, forming a curve towards the South to collect the water from the outlet (coming from the South) of Lac Travers, to the outlet (coming from the North) of the Lake Lake trout and Grand lac Bonhomme;
  towards the South-East by crossing a marsh area, to the mouth of Lac aux Rats that the current crosses on  towards the South;
  south-east, up to the bridge of a forest road;
  south-east, to the mouth of Lac du Cygne that the current crosses over its full length;
  south-east, to the northwest shore of Lac Panache;
  to the Southwest, crossing Lac Panache to its mouth.

Intermediate course 
(segment of )

From the mouth of Lac Panache, the Croche river flows on:
  south-west, to the mouth of Lac au Ruisseau that the current crosses over its full length;
  towards the southwest by collecting the waters of the Goélands stream (coming from the west), up to the limit of the canton of Bécart;
  southwards, to the mouth of Lac Davenne that the current crosses over its full length;
  towards the south, with several falls and rapids, until the confluence of the Patrick River (coming from the northeast);
  towards the south, by forming a hook towards the west, up to the limit of La Tuque;
  towards the southeast in La Tuque, until the confluence of the Rivière du Brûlé (Croche River) (coming from the northeast);

Lower course 
(segment of )

From the confluence of the rivière du Brûlé, the Croche river flows on:
  southwards, to a bridge over a forest road;
  towards the South by forming a curve towards the North-East, up to the limit of the canton of Lavoie;
  towards the South, forming the limit between the canton of Langelier and Malhiot, and passing under the railway bridge, until the confluence of the river. 

The Croche river flows in a narrow valley generally in a south direction, forming lakes in succession and numerous meander s in the lower part, which characterize its appellation. Many small streams feed the northern half of its route. For several segments of its route, this river flows through numerous rapids, falls and waterfalls.

History 
Formerly a deciduous forest dominated vegetation in the downstream part of the watershed of the Croche river, because the soil was rich in alluvium. In the late 19th and early 20th centuries, the watershed of the river was cleared to make way for agriculture. Several farms were established. Despite its shallow depth, the river was used to float logs to feed sawmills and pulp mills located in the La Tuque and downstream on the Saint-Maurice River.

Probably built initially by the Halls (Bébé Tessier), the "ferme de la Croche" (La Croche Farm) was acquired successively by several forestry companies, in particular the one owned by Alex Baptist. Bishop Caron, a great explorer of Haute-Mauricie in the 20th century, suggests in his 1887 travel report that this farm was rented in 1887 to the Halls. Around 1890, this farm would probably have been abandoned and passed for haunted.

Toponymy 
The name «Croche River» was formalized on December 5, 1968, at the Bank of place names of Commission de toponymie du Québec (Geographical Names Board of Québec).

According to the Commission de toponymie du Québec (Geographical Names Board of Québec) in 1863, Stanislas Drapeau mentioned in his notes the name of "rivière Croche" (Croche River). The land surveyor Du Tremblay described it as well in 1873. In popular language, the term "Croche" often refers to a serpentine path makes a hook or streamers. The toponyms "Croche" and Crooked is widespread in the places names in Quebec, including 102 lakes that are so designated. Given that many rivers used the word «Croche» in their names, the authorities replaced some of them with more distinctive names. The number of 145, these ancient lakes Croche or Crooked particular received or sometimes taken other specific descriptive French terms (Crochet, "Crochu" (Hooked), "Sinueux" (Curvy), "Coudé" (Bent), etc.). Surnames and forenames (Gabriel Forster, Laflamme, Daniel, Colette, etc..) or Native American names (Manitou, Wapizagonke, Kiwatin, Causapscal, etc.).

In addition, the Bank of place names of Quebec includes five "Croche rivers", a small Croche river and a small North Croche, as well as "rivière crochue" (Croche River). Seven "Croche Rivers" or "Crooked rivers" received or taken other names such as "Lecompte river", Auriac river, "du Gouffre Sud-Ouest" and Camitogama. The "Croche" term is present in the names of three populated places in Quebec: Lac-Croche, Quebec in Matawinie, La Croche, "Rivière Croche" (Croche River) in Mauricie.

See also 
Le Domaine-du-Roy Regional County Municipality
La Tuque (urban agglomeration)
La Tuque, une ville
Lac-Ashuapmushuan, un TNO
Saint-Maurice River
Petite rivière Croche
Rivière du Brûlé
Patrick River
Liste des cours d'eau du bassin du Saint-Maurice
List of rivers of Quebec

References

External links 
Tourisme Mauricie Regional tourist office

Rivers of Mauricie
Landforms of La Tuque, Quebec
Rivers of Saguenay–Lac-Saint-Jean
Tributaries of the Saint-Maurice River